Debbie Miller (born 27 September 1951) is a Canadian sprinter. She competed in the women's 100 metres at the 1968 Summer Olympics.

References

1950 births
Living people
Sportspeople from Halifax, Nova Scotia
Athletes (track and field) at the 1968 Summer Olympics
Canadian female sprinters
Olympic track and field athletes of Canada
Olympic female sprinters